Roman Markovich Shvartsman (born November 7, 1936) is chairman of the Odessa regional Association of Jews – former prisoners of ghetto and Nazi concentration camps.

He is Vice President of the Ukrainian Association of Jews - former prisoners of ghetto and Nazi concentration camps, and Chairman of the Association of Boris Zabarko.

He is also Deputy chairman of the Council of Odessa society of Jewish culture and Manager of its social and cultural center.

Biography 

Roman Markovich Shvartsman was born in 1936, in a simple Jewish family in the city of Bershad, Vinnytsia Oblast. The family had nine children, the seventh of whom was Roman Shvartsman. His mother was a housewife, his father worked at the Bershad distillery as a security guard. When the Second World War ended, all archival and personal documents were burned and then, to restore the age of Roman, a doctor of the local clinic conducted an external examination.

In 1955, he moved to Odessa, where he entered the vocational school № 2, in 1956, he received a specialty fitter. From 1957 to 1963 he studied at the Odessa National Maritime Academy, with a speciality as engineer-mechanic.

Roman began his career at the Odessa plant Poligrafmash, where he works now. There is only one entry in his workbook.

In 1959, Roman married.

In 1992 Roman became a member of the international organization of former ghetto prisoners and concentration camps, which was founded in Odessa in 1991.

Currently, he remains a permanent and active member of the organization. In 1991, at the first Congress, the members of the international organization decided to create a regional Association of former prisoners of ghettos and concentration camps, and the headquarters of the international Union was moved to Moscow.

In 1991 the Odessa regional Association of the former prisoners of the ghetto was created, where Roman was Deputy Chairman, which at that time was Leonid Sushon.

In 2002, at the Odessa regional conference, dedicated to the results of the Association, Roman was elected Chairman of the Association, the head of which he is to date.

He contributes to the annual commemoration on January 27, in the Prokhorovsky square, of the International day of remembrance of the victims of the Holocaust He has been a guest of honor at international conferences on the topic of the Holocaust.

He was involved in the development and improvement of the Holocaust Museum, which was created and opened by the Association of prisoners in 2009.

Memories of the Holocaust 
In 1941 the whole of Ukraine was occupied by German and Romanian troops. In the early days of the outbreak of war Roman's father and older brother went to the front. In early July, his mother, with her eight young children, tried to evacuate. After two weeks attempts at evacuation, they were forced to return home, because of active offensive fascist troops.

In late July, early August in Bershad the Germans came. And in early September by the decree of the commandant of the German administration, two ghettos were organized in the territory of the city, in one of which was Roman's family.

In the Bershad ghetto Jews were deported from Bessarabia and nearby areas of the Vinnytsia region.

The total number of Jews amounted to 25,000 people. For the period from June 1941 until March 1944 German and Romanian fascists killed 13,871 Jews.

During the occupation in 1942, an operation on repair of the bridge across the river Dohno, at the hands of Romanian caretakers one of Roman's older brothers was shot. Slightly later this history formed the basis of one of the films of the Israeli film director Boris Maftsir.

Intolerable living conditions in the ghetto has left its mark for life.

On March 29, 1944 the city of Bershad was liberated by the Red Army.

In 1945, after the liberation of Europe from the fascist plague, Roman's father was mobilized from Berlin for the war. He returned home only in 1946, after the Red Army defeated fascist Japan.

Roman's elder brother joined the army and did not return. It was only in 1953 that his family received notice of his death, in which it was claimed that he died heroically on the Northern front, defending Leningrad. His name is recorded in the "Black Book", a compilation of documents and testimonies of Jewish victims of the Holocaust edited by Vasily Grossman and Ilya Ehrenburg.

Rewards 
The Order "For merits" of 1rd degree

The Order "For merits" of 2rd degree

The Order "For merits" of 3rd degree

The Order for labour distinction

The Order "The Deserved machine engineer"

Mark of distinction in front of Odessa

Jubilee medal for the State and International merit

Badge of honor the mayor of Odessa "Labour glory"

Public activity

Odessa regional Association of former ghetto prisoners and concentration camps 
In Odessa the first constituent Congress was created, in which was created the International Union of Jews - former prisoners of ghettos and Nazi concentration camps. And only a few years later such associations opened in Kiev and Moscow.

In 1991 the Odessa regional Association of the former prisoners of the ghetto and concentration camps was created.

The main purpose of the Association is to unite Jews-former prisoners of the ghetto and Nazi concentration camps, during the Second World War, protect their rights and freedoms, coordinate the activities of the associations, located on the territory of Odessa and Odessa region. The objectives of the Association: countering fascism, extremism and other manifestations of racial discrimination, identification of places of mass destruction of Jews during the Second World War, perpetuating the memory of genocide victims, perpetuation and search of people, saving Jews, in order to grant them the title of Righteous among the Nations of the world.

Monuments to the victims of the Holocaust 
Particular mention should be made of the activities of the Chairman of the Odessa regional organization of former prisoners of ghetto and concentration camps, Roman Shvartsman: through his efforts it became possible to establish in Odessa, the Odessa region and Nikolayev region area more than thirty monuments and memorials, dedicated to the memory of Jews, destroyed in the Disaster.

In memory of the victims of the Holocaust on the Lustdorf road, 27 a Memorial complex was built; each year on 23 October a mourning rally occurs.

In this place was found three additional sites with remains, and probably there are two more. Romanian and German occupiers burned 25,000 Jewish children, women, and elderly people.

As Roman Schwartzman commented:»

In Prokhorovsky Square, on the site of the Holocaust memorial (road of death), created by the prisoner of the Bogdanovka ghetto, Yakov Maniovich, under the guidance of Roman Shvartsman events are constantly held for the care of monuments and the alley of the Righteous Among the Nations.

In 2016 in the town of Balta, on central square the memorial to the victims of the Holocaust was opened, a memorial to the victims of the Holocaust and the Righteous of the Nations of the world, including Queen Elena of Romania.

The monuments are also open in the village of Domanevka, Bogdanovka village, in the city of Belgorod-Dniester, in the city of Savran, the city of Tarutino and many others settlements of the territory of Transnistria.

According to Roman Shvartsman, about 240,000 Jews were killed by the Nazis in the territory of Transnistria. In 2015 in the village of Gvozdavka 2 a mass grave was discovered with the remains of about 3,500 Jews. Later a memorial sign was placed there.

In an interview with the Associated Press, Roman Shvartsman said:

The creation of a Museum of the Holocaust 

The official opening of the Holocaust Museum in Odessa took place on June 22, 2009.

The Chairman of the Association of former concentration camp prisoners and ghetto, Roman Shvartsman noted:

For the time being the Museum presents more than 4,000 exhibits. A few years after the opening, the Museum was visited by about 20,000 people from around the world: ambassadors, diplomats, leaders of the city and region, students and schoolchildren and just people, who remember or want to know about that terrible tragedy, which is called the Holocaust.

References

External links 
 
 Six candles were lit in Odessa
 In memory of the Jews-tarutintsev
 Sorrowful lullaby
 Memory of Holocaust victims honored in Odessa
 In memory of the victims of the Holocaust

Holocaust survivors
Living people
1936 births
People from Bershad
Odesa Jews
Recipients of the Cross of the Order of Merit of the Federal Republic of Germany